Teboho Patrick Mokoena  (born 10 July 1974 in Thokoza, Gauteng) is a South African association football player. He last played as a midfielder for Mpumalanga Black Aces F.C.

Career
Teboho is resisting the temptation of giving up on football by keeping fit in the amateur ranks. It is now more than two months since Bidvest Wits chose not to renew the 34-year-old's contract and Mokoena says he still wants to keep his fitness level up to a competitive standard.

Playing career
 Dangerous Aces (1996–1998)
 Jomo Cosmos (1998–2001)
 FC St. Gallen (2001–2002)
 Jomo Cosmos (2002–2004)
 Mamelodi Sundowns (2004–2005)
 Jomo Cosmos (2005–2006)
 Bidvest Wits (2006–2008)
 Mpumalanga Black Aces F.C. (2009–)

International career
He has 27 caps and 5 goals for South Africa, and was a participant at the 2002 FIFA World Cup, scoring one goal against Paraguay in the group stage.

International goals for South Africa
Score and results list South Africa's goal tally first.

References

1974 births
Living people
People from the East Rand
South African Sotho people
South African soccer players
South African expatriate soccer players
2002 FIFA World Cup players
2004 African Cup of Nations players
Jomo Cosmos F.C. players
Association football midfielders
Mamelodi Sundowns F.C. players
Bidvest Wits F.C. players
FC St. Gallen players
Expatriate footballers in Switzerland
South African expatriate sportspeople in Switzerland
South Africa international soccer players
Mpumalanga Black Aces F.C. players
Soccer players from Gauteng